Wayta Hirka Punta (Quechua wayta crest; wild flower; the whistling of the wind, Ancash Quechua hirka mountain, punta peak; ridge; first, before, in front of, also spelled Huayta Jirca Punta) is a mountain in the Andes of Peru which  reaches a height of approximately . It is located in the Huánuco Region, Dos de Mayo Province, Marías District. Wayta Hirka Punta lies south of Tikti Punta and southeast of a lake named Saqsaqucha ("multi-colored lake").

References

Mountains of Peru
Mountains of Huánuco Region